Events from the year 1933 in Sweden

Incumbents
 Monarch – Gustaf V
 Prime Minister – Per Albin Hansson

Events

 1933 - Social Democratic Party's Agreement with the Agrarian Party - The Social Democrats evolved from a purely class party to a broader party for ordinary people by the agreement with the Agrarian Party in 1933

Popular culture

Sports 
 11–12 February – The ladies and pairs  1933 World Figure Skating Championships took place in Stockholm

Births

 14 February – Jan Mårtenson, diplomat and crime novelist 
 11 March –Sivar Nordström, orienteering competitor, co-founder of O-Ringen (died 2013).
 19 May – Carl Billquist, actor (died 1993).
 12 June – Ivar Nilsson, speed skater.
 13 June – Börje Carlsson, sailor.
 13 June – Sven-Olov Sjödelius, sprint canoer.
 24 June – Lars Wohlin, politician 
 11 July – Per Myrberg, singer and actor
 12 August – Anita Gradin, politician 
 27 August – Kerstin Ekman, novelist.
 6 September – Axel Leijonhufvud, economist (died 2022)

Deaths

 7 April - Jenny Brandt, ballerina  (born 1867).
 26 July – Emil Magnusson, discus thrower (born 1887).

Exact date missing 
 Axel Hamberg, mineralogist, geographer, Arctic explorer (born 1863).
 Axel Jungstedt, painter (born 1859).
 - Alma Åkermark, feminist and editor  (born 1853)

References

 
Sweden
Years of the 20th century in Sweden